Simone Collio (born 27 December 1979 in Cernusco sul Naviglio) is an Italian sprinter who specializes in the 60 and 100 metres. His personal best times are 6.55 seconds in the 60 metres (indoor) and 10.06 seconds in the 100 metres, the third all-time best performance in the Italian ranking of 100 meters, after the 10.01 at altitude of Pietro Mennea and 9.99 of Filippo Tortu.

Biography
Participating in the 2004 Summer Olympics, he achieved fourth place in his 100 metres heat, thus securing qualification to the second round. He then achieved sixth place in his second round heat, thus failing to secure qualification to the semi-finals. At the 2008 Summer Olympics in Beijing he competed at the 100 metres sprint and placed 3rd in his heat behind Richard Thompson and Martial Mbandjock in a time of 10.32 seconds. He qualified for the second round in which he failed to qualify for the semi finals as his time of 10.33 was the 7th time in his race, causing elimination. Together with Fabio Cerutti, Emanuele di Gregorio and Jacques Riparelli he also competed at the 4x100 metres relay. In their qualification heat they were disqualified and eliminated for the further competition.

Personal life
He was engaged to the Bulgarian sprinter Ivet Lalova, whom he met in Sofia. They married in September 2013.

Personal bests

All information taken from IAAF profile.

Achievements

National titles
He won 7 national championships at individual senior level.
Italian Athletics Championships
100 metres: 2004, 2005, 2009, 2010
Italian Indoor Athletics Championships
60 metres: 2004, 2005, 2009

See also
 Italian all-time lists - 100 metres
 Italy national relay team

References

External links
 

1979 births
Living people
People from Cernusco sul Naviglio
Italian male sprinters
Athletes (track and field) at the 2004 Summer Olympics
Athletes (track and field) at the 2008 Summer Olympics
Athletes (track and field) at the 2012 Summer Olympics
Olympic athletes of Italy
Athletics competitors of Fiamme Gialle
European Athletics Championships medalists
Mediterranean Games gold medalists for Italy
Athletes (track and field) at the 2009 Mediterranean Games
Athletes (track and field) at the 2013 Mediterranean Games
World Athletics Championships athletes for Italy
Mediterranean Games medalists in athletics
Italian Athletics Championships winners
Sportspeople from the Metropolitan City of Milan